Jennifer is the third album by singer Jennifer Warnes, released on the Reprise Records label in 1972. It was produced by former Velvet Underground member John Cale.

It sold poorly and was deleted from the Warners catalog in 1973 or 1974 and remained unavailable until 2013 when Japanese Reprise reissued it on CD (WPCR-14865).

Track listing 
 "In The Morning" (Barry Gibb) – 2:57 
 "P.F. Sloan" (Jim Webb) – 3:50 
 "Empty Bottles" (John Cale) – 3:03 
 "Sand and Foam" (Donovan Leitch) – 2:33 
 "Be My Friend" (Andy Fraser, Paul Rodgers) – 4:48 
 "Needle and Thread" (Carolin Gunston, Peter James Wilson) – 3:53 
 "Last Song" (Jennifer Warnes)  – 3:13
 "All My Love's Laughter" (Jim Webb) – 3:20 
 "These Days" (Jackson Browne) – 3:19 
 "Magdalene (My Regal Zonophone)" (Gary Brooker, Keith Reid) – 3:50

Personnel 
 Jennifer Warnes – vocals
 Jim Horn – saxophone
 Milt Holland – drums, percussion
 Sneaky Pete Kleinow – pedal steel guitar
 Spooner Oldham – organ, piano, keyboards
 Ron Elliott – guitar, vocals
 Jackson Browne – guitar
 Richie Hayward – drums
 Russ Kunkel – drums
 Wilton Felder – bass
 St. Paul's Cathedral Boys Choir – backing vocals on "P.F. Sloan"
Technical
 John Cale – production
Phil Schier - engineer
Ed Thrasher - art direction, photography
Dave Bhang - album design

References 

Jennifer Warnes albums
1972 albums
Reprise Records albums
Albums produced by John Cale